Christine Ingrid Wolf, OAM (born 3 March 1980) is an Australian Paralympic athlete born in Germany who competed for Germany and Australia mainly in category F42 long jump and T 42 100m events.

Early life

Wolf was born in Kirchheim unter Teck (near Stuttgart) in southern Germany.  She was diagnosed with leg cancer in the left leg at the age of 10 and had her leg amputated at the age of 15 after five years of unsuccessful chemotherapy and numerous infections. After her amputation, she was informed about the Paralympic Games and visited Atlanta for the 1996 Games. In 1997, she started running with a prosthetic leg.

Career
She trained for the Sydney Games but could not compete in her classification TF42 as there were no events scheduled.  She competed for Germany in the 2004 Athens Paralympics, she won a silver medal in the women's long jump F42 event. After the Games, she was dissatisfied with her results and nearly left the sport. At the Games, she became friendly with Australian athletes and in February 2005 moved to Australia to train at the Australian Institute of Sport (AIS). She was offered a scholarship and was coached by Irina Dvoskina. When applying for Australian citizenship, she stated that "I didn’t want the Germans to get any credit for my improvements so I said I wanted to compete for Australia". The citizenship was approved just prior to the Games.  She competed at the 2008 Beijing Paralympics. There she won a gold medal in the women's long jump F42 event, for which she received a Medal of the Order of Australia, and a bronze medal in the women's 100m T42 event.

After the Games,  she left the AIS in Canberra as she wanted to live somewhere with white sand, sunshine and palm trees. She moved to Cairns in Far North Queensland and works as a personal trainer. She now plays wheelchair basketball.

References

1980 births
Living people
Paralympic athletes of Australia
Paralympic athletes of Germany
Athletes (track and field) at the 2004 Summer Paralympics
Athletes (track and field) at the 2008 Summer Paralympics
Paralympic gold medalists for Australia
Paralympic silver medalists for Germany
Paralympic bronze medalists for Australia
Medalists at the 2004 Summer Paralympics
Medalists at the 2008 Summer Paralympics
Amputee category Paralympic competitors
German emigrants to Australia
People from Kirchheim unter Teck
Sportspeople from Stuttgart (region)
Australian amputees
German expatriate sportspeople in Australia
German amputees
Recipients of the Medal of the Order of Australia
Australian Institute of Sport Paralympic track and field athletes
Paralympic medalists in athletics (track and field)
Australian female sprinters
Australian female long jumpers
German female sprinters
German female long jumpers
20th-century Australian women
21st-century Australian women